Kaiki Nobuhide (born 12 June 1952 as Masaaki Nishino) is a former sumo wrestler from Tenmabayashi, Aomori, Japan. He made his professional debut in 1965, and was promoted to the top makuuchi division in 1975. He earned three gold stars for defeating yokozuna and one special prize. His highest rank was sekiwake, which he reached in July 1979. He retired in 1987 and was the head coach of the Tomozuna stable from 1989 until 2017, training ōzeki Kaiō among others. He was also a Director of the Japan Sumo Association. In 2017 he was re-hired by the Sumo Association as a consultant after retiring as head coach.

Career
Making his debut in September 1965 at the age of just 13, he stood at only  and weighed just . He initially fought under his own surname of Nishino, becoming Nishinishiki in 1973. In September 1973 he became a fully fledged sekitori, and he adopted the ring name of Kaiki in 1975. He eventually reached the top makuuchi division in November 1975, ten years after his debut but still aged only 23. He fought in the top makuuchi division for 66 tournaments in total and earned three gold stars for defeating yokozuna. He earned one sanshō or special prize, which came in his debut tournament at the rank of komusubi in May 1979 when he shared the Fighting Spirit Award with Ōzutsu. He was promoted to sekiwake for the following tournament in July 1979. Although he scored only three wins against twelve losses in what was to be his only tournament at sekiwake, two of those wins were against yokozuna Kitanoumi and ōzeki Asahikuni. He made the san'yaku ranks twice more, in July 1980 and January 1981, but on both occasions had a make-koshi or losing record at komusubi. He fought in the maegashira ranks until November 1986 when he was demoted to the jūryō division. He retired two tournaments later after the March 1987 honbasho.

Retirement from sumo
Upon his retirement he became an elder of the Japan Sumo Association under the name Takashima Oyakata, working as a coach. He recruited Kaiō in March 1988, whom he had been aware of when he was still an active wrestler. He became head of the Tomozuna stable in May 1989 upon the mandatory retirement of the previous head, former jūryō Ichinishiki (who was also his father-in-law). In 1993 Kaiō reached the top division, and became an ōzeki in 2000. In 2006 Tomozuna Oyakata became a Director on the board of the Sumo Association, initially in charge of the Education department and running the sumo school. He continued to produce top level wrestlers, with Kaisei reaching the top division in 2011. In April 2012 Tomozuna stable absorbed Ōshima stable when its stablemaster retired. Kyokutenhō then immediately won the top division championship in May 2012, giving Tomozuna stable another championship to go with the five won by Kaiō.

In an interview in 2006 Tomozuna criticized his former wrestler Sentoryū, and yokozuna Akebono, who both moved into mixed martial arts, for continuing to use their traditional ring names outside of the sumo world.

In June 2017 he passed on ownership of the Tomozuna name to the former Kyokutenhō and retired from his head coach role upon reaching 65 years of age, although he was re-hired as a consultant on reduced pay for a period of five years.  He went back to the Tomozuna name in February 2022 when Tomozuna stable was renamed Ōshima stable.
 
Tomozuna's consultancy role expired upon his 70th birthday in June 2022, ending his 57-year stay in the Japan Sumo Association.

Personal life
His son, Kuniaki, was born in 1979 and in 1995 entered sumo himself. He was known as Kaishoryū and retired in 2010, having never achieved sekitori status. His highest rank was makushita 6.

Career record

See also
Glossary of sumo terms
List of past sumo wrestlers
List of sumo elders
List of sekiwake

References

1952 births
Living people
Japanese sumo wrestlers
Sumo people from Aomori Prefecture
Sekiwake